Collision Course: Truman vs. MacArthur is a 1976 American made-for-television historical drama film about the confrontation between President Harry S. Truman and General of the Army Douglas MacArthur during the Korean War.

Premise
U.S. President Harry S. Truman (E.G. Marshall) and his commander in the Korean War, General Douglas MacArthur (Henry Fonda), disagree on war strategy. Their conflict comes to a head when Truman relieves the insubordinate MacArthur of his command.

Cast 
 Henry Fonda as General Douglas MacArthur
 E. G. Marshall as President Harry S. Truman
 Lucille Benson as Bess Truman
 Lloyd Bochner as Averell Harriman
 Russell Johnson as General George Stratemeyer
 Howard Hesseman as AP Man

References
Collision Course: Truman vs. MacArthur at IMDB

1976 television films
1976 films
ABC network original films
American drama television films
Films directed by Anthony Page
1970s war films
1970s historical films